Curling at the 2003 Winter Universiade took place from January 17 to 23 at the Curling Arena in Tarvisio, Italy.

Men

Teams

Round-robin standings

Round-robin results

Draw 1
Friday, January 17, 10:00

Draw 2
Friday, January 17, 19:00

Draw 3
Saturday, January 18, 13:30

Draw 4
Sunday, January 19, 9:00

Draw 5
Sunday, January 19, 18:00

Draw 6
Monday, January 20, 13:30

Draw 7
Tuesday, January 21, 9:00

Draw 8
Tuesday, January 21, 18:00

Draw 9
Wednesday, January 22, 9:00

Playoffs

Semifinals
Thursday, January 23, 10:00

Bronze Medal Game
Thursday, January 23, 15:30

Gold Medal Game
Thursday, January 23, 15:30

Women

Teams

Round-robin standings

Round-robin results

Draw 1
Friday, January 17, 14:30

Draw 2
Saturday, January 18, 9:00

Draw 3
Saturday, January 18, 18:00

Draw 4
Sunday, January 19, 13:30

Draw 5
Monday, January 20, 9:00

Draw 6
Monday, January 20, 18:00

Draw 7
Tuesday, January 21, 13:30

Playoffs

Semifinals
Thursday, January 23, 10:00

Bronze Medal Game
Thursday, January 23, 15:30

Gold Medal Game
Thursday, January 23, 15:30

External links

2003
2003 in curling
2003 Winter Universiade
International curling competitions hosted by Italy